X-periMENTAL is a children's game show that aired on BBC One from 8 January 2003 to 1 March 2004. It is first hosted by Ortis Deley in 2003 and then hosted by Simon Grant in 2004.

Format

Series 1
2 teams of 3 from different schools would battle in various science experiments and the objective was to get in 1st or 2nd on the leaderboard. Then the top two at the end of the series would compete to become champions.

Series 2
There was the studio audience who had to guess to right outcomes of the experiments with an A, B or C option. The audience designs are also put to the test for real life situations.

Transmissions

References

External links

2003 British television series debuts
2004 British television series endings
2000s British children's television series
BBC children's television shows
British children's game shows
English-language television shows
Television series by Banijay